David Mason ( – 5 July 1966), also known by his Māori name, Rawiri Meihana, was a New Zealand rugby league footballer who played in the 1910s. He played at representative level for New Zealand (Heritage № 57), and Nelson, as a forward (prior to the specialist positions of), during the era of contested scrums.

Playing career

Nelson rugby league
Mason was playing rugby league in the Nelson area. He was a member of the St Mary's club. In 1911 following the tour of Australia with the New Zealand team Mason was selected for the Northern Tour conducted by the Nelson representative side. He played in 3 matches, the first was against Auckland at Victoria Park before a crowd of 5,000. Auckland won 36-12 with Mason kicking a penalty. The second match was against Taranaki in Eltham which the local side won 16-8, while the third was against Wanganui at Cooks Gardens. Wanganui won 40-0 before a crowd of around 750. He played again for Nelson in 1912 against Wellington at St Patricks College in a 19-6 loss and then in July he played for Golden Bay against Nelson. This was followed on October 12 with a match against Marlborough in Blenheim which Nelson won 21 to 6. In 1913 he played 3 more matches for Nelson against Marlborough (35-0), Auckland (2-16), and the touring New South Wales side. They were thrashed 66-2 in front of 1,500 at Trafalgar Park.

International honours
He impressed the selectors and was nominated for inclusion in the New Zealand team for Australia by the Nelson union. He was subsequently selected for the 1911 New Zealand tour of Australia and played 4 matches, scoring 2 tries and kicking 2 goals. Prior to departure he made his New Zealand debut in a match against Auckland at the Takapuna Racecourse on June 10. New Zealand won 16-14 with Mason scoring a try.

Personal life
Mason was a farmer at Tākaka. Of Māori descent, he affiliated to Te Atiawa o Te Waka-a-Māui. He died on 5 July 1966, aged 77 years, and was buried at Rototai Cemetery.

References

1880s births
1966 deaths
Date of birth missing
New Zealand Māori rugby league players
New Zealand national rugby league team players
New Zealand rugby league players
People from Golden Bay
Place of birth missing
Place of death missing
Rugby league forwards
Rugby league players from Tasman District
Tasman rugby league team players
Te Atiawa o Te Waka-a-Māui people